Bernard Edwards Jr. (born November 6, 1972), professionally known as Focus..., is an American music producer from New York City. He gained major recognition in the music industry when he signed with Dr. Dre's Aftermath Entertainment, in 2002. Since then he has produced tracks for several prominent artists, including Dr. Dre, Eminem, Kendrick Lamar, Snoop Dogg, Rick Ross, John Legend, The Game, Ice Cube, Busta Rhymes, Fabolous, 50 Cent, Schoolboy Q, Joe, Christina Aguilera, Jennifer Lopez, Beyoncé, Lil Wayne, Ameriie, Christina Millian, Mac Dre, Marsha Ambrosius among others.

Life and career
Focus... is the son of the late Bernard Edwards, co-founder of disco and R&B band Chic. He was born in Manhattan, New York City, and raised in the Tri-State Region. Edwards Jr. credits his father with his love for the production side of music, which he developed from an early age, attending numerous studio sessions with his father.

Focus...'s production talents were first recognized by Dr. Dre when an artist Edwards Jr. had produced, Daks, greatly impressed the Aftermath label head. He later signed Focus... so that the two could then continue working together.

The beginning of 2009 saw Focus leave Aftermath after seven years with the label.

In 2014, Focus returned to Aftermath Entertainment as an official staff producer where he worked side by side with Dr. Dre and collaborators to help craft the Grammy nominated, highly anticipated album Compton. Compton was certified gold by the Recording Industry Association of America (RIAA).

Focus is now the CEO of his own entertainment company N|VZXN Entertainment.

Production

1999

Solé – Skin Deep
"I'm Coming" (Intro)
"Spell My Name Right" (featuring Mr. Raja) (produced with Tricky Stewart)
"Antoine's Interlude" (produced with Tricky Stewart)
"Young Niggas" (produced with Tricky Stewart)
"Pain" (produced with Tricky Stewart)

2000

Joe – My Name Is Joe
"Get Crunk Tonight"

Kandi Burruss – Hey Kandi...
"Introduction"
"Hey Kandi"
"Pants on Fire"
"Talking' Bout Me"
"Sucka for You"
"Outro"

2001

Christina Milian – Christina Milian
"It Hurts When..." (produced with Montell Jordan)
"Twitch" (produced with Montell Jordan)

Destiny's Child – 8 Days of Christmas
"Spread a Little Love on Christmas Day" (produced with Beyoncé Knowles, Ric Wake)

Various artists – The Wash
"Riding High" (Daks featuring R.C.)

2002

Truth Hurts – Truthfully Speaking
"Next To Me"
"Do Me"

Jennifer Lopez – This Is Me... Then
"Dear Ben" (produced with Cory Rooney)

Petey Pablo – Drumline
"Club Banger"

Montell Jordan – Montell Jordan
"MJ V Intro"
MJ Anthem
Top Or Bottom
"Mine, Mine, Mine" (included in Rush Hour 2)
Why Can’t We
The Rain

2003

Sly Boogy – Judgement Day
"California" (featuring Butch Cassidy, Truth Hurts)

Beyoncé Knowles – Dangerously in Love
"Yes" (produced with Beyoncé Knowles)

2004

Petey Pablo – Still Writing in My Diary: 2nd Entry
"Roll Off"

Mac Dre – Ronald Dregan: Dreganomics
"Get Stupid"

Wylde Bunch – Wylde Tymes at Washington High
"Our Lyfe"

2005

The Game – The Documentary
"Where I'm From" (featuring Nate Dogg)

112 – Pleasure & Pain
"U Already Know" (produced with Sean Garrett)

Outlawz – Outlaw 4 Life: 2005 A.P.
"Real Talk" (featuring Focus...)
"If You Want 2"
"I Dare U" (featuring Focus...)

Sway & King Tech – Back 2 Basics
"Watch Closer" (featuring Chino XL, Tracy Lane)
"I Don't Think So" (featuring Kam)
"We Don't Give A..." (featuring Kallihan, Hellraiza)
"Hands to the Sky" (featuring Verb & Rock)

Tony Yayo – Thoughts of a Predicate Felon
"Eastside Westside"
"Project Princess" (featuring Jagged Edge)
"Live by the Gun"

2006

Stat Quo – Eminem Presents: The Re-Up
"By My Side"

2007
Bishop Lamont – N***** Noise
"Klansmen"
"American Dreams"

Salah Edin – Nederlands Grootste Nachtmerrie
"NGN" (featuring Focus...)
"T.H.E.O. (Teleurstelling, Haat, Ergernis & Onbegrip)"
"Het Land Van..."
"Geliefd Om Gehaat Te Worden"
"Opgeblazen" (featuring Opgezwolle)
"0172"
"Zwarte Gat Op Het Witte Doek" (featuring Focus...)
"Geld" (featuring Caprice)
"Hosselaar"
"Vrouwtje Is Een Bitch"
"Samen Huilen, Samen Lachen"
"Koning Ter Rijk"
"Oog Om Oog" (featuring Probz)
"Paradijs Is Nu"

La Fouine – Aller-Retour
"Intro"
"La Danse Du Ghetto"
"C'est Pas La Peine"
"Contrôle Abusif"
"Laissez-Moi Dénoncer"
"Partout Pareil"

Keke Palmer – So Uncool
"The Game Song"
"Music Box"

2008

Girlicious – Girlicious
"Mirror"

Bishop Lamont – The Confessional
"The Confessional" (Intro)
"Better Than You"
"The Name" (featuring Dirty Birdy, Kida, Flii Stylz)

2009

Busta Rhymes – Back on My B.S.
"Respect My Conglomerate" (featuring Lil Wayne, Jadakiss)
"If You Don't Know Now You Know" (featuring Big Tigger)

Slaughterhouse – Slaughterhouse
"Lyrical Murderers" (featuring K-Young)

2010

Christina Aguilera – Bionic
"Morning Dessert" (Intro)
"Sex for Breakfast"

Bishop Lamont – The Shawshank Redemption/Angola 3
"Martin Luther King" (Intro)
"Affirmative Action" (featuring Focus...)

2011

Marsha Ambrosius – Late Nights & Early Mornings
"Tears"

Schoolboy Q – Setbacks
"Light Years Ahead (Sky High)" (featuring Kendrick Lamar)

Jay Rock – Follow Me Home
"Bout That"

Rapper Big Pooh – Dirty Pretty Things
"Right With You" (featuring Focus...)
"Real Love" (featuring Focus...)

Outlawz – Perfect Timing
"Keep It Lit" (featuring Yung Phat Pat)

2012

50 Cent – 5 (Murder by Numbers)
"My Crown"

Busta Rhymes – Year of the Dragon
"Do That Thing"

Xzibit – Napalm
"Killer's Remorse" (featuring Bishop Lamont, Young De, B-Real)

Skyzoo – A Dream Deferred
"Drew & Derwin" (featuring Raheem DeVaughn)

TheKidJ Presents Handsonhiphop (The Street Album)
"Love & Hip-hop" (featuring Redd Lettaz)

2013

TGT – Three Kings
"Interlude" (credited as B. Edwards Jr.)

Slum Village – Evolution
"Summer Breeze"
"1 Nite" (featuring Vice)

Terrace Martin – 3ChordFold
"Watch U Sleep"

2015

Dr. Dre – Compton
 "Intro
 "Loose Cannons"  
 "Issues" 
 "Deep Water" 
 "One Shot One Kill" 
 "Medicine Man" 

Wu-Tang Clan – Once Upon a Time in Shaolin
 "Hail, Snow & Earthquakes / Rainy Dayz II" 

Ameriie – Drive
"Every Time"

2016

DJ Mustard Presents – Cold Summer
 "Another Summer" 

Damian Lillard – The Letter O
 "Thank You"

2018
Marsha Ambrosius – Nyla
 "Flood"
 "I Got It Bad" (produced with Marsha Ambrosius and Stereotypes)
 "Let Out"
 "Today" (produced with Best Kept Secret)
 "Grand Finale"

2019
Little Brother – May the Lord Watch
 "Black Magic (Make It Better)"
 "Goodmorning Sunshine"
 "Work Through Me" (produced with Blaaq Gold)

2020
Busta Rhymes –  Extinction Level Event 2: The Wrath of God
 "Don't Go" 

Eminem –  Music to Be Murdered By – Side B (Deluxe edition)
 "She Loves Me"

2022
Diamond D - The Rear View
 "Live My Life"

References

External links
 
 
 
 

1972 births
American hip hop record producers
Living people
East Coast hip hop musicians
African-American record producers
African-American songwriters
American rhythm and blues musicians
American bass guitarists
American multi-instrumentalists
Songwriters from New York (state)
Guitarists from New York City
American male bass guitarists
Record producers from New York (state)
African-American guitarists
21st-century African-American people
20th-century African-American people
American male songwriters